Martin Dobrović or Martin Dubravić (1599–1621) was a Catholic priest. After finishing his education in Graz, he became a parson of Ivanić Grad and later became a priest in the Roman Catholic Archdiocese of Zagreb.

Early life and education 
Born in a Serbian Orthodox Christian family, Dobrović was born to parents who had migrated from Bosnia to what is now modern-day  Croatia. Later, his family converted to Catholicism. With a recommendation from the Bishop of Ljubljana, Thomas Chrön, the Catholic church educated him as a priest at a school in Graz. He studied there from 1599-1608. As a student of literature, he wrote a song entitled Eidem, which was published in 1601. After graduating, Dobrović became parson of Ivanić and chaplain of the German Military Garrison in Ivanić.

Conversion of Orthodox Serbians to Catholicism 
As parson of Ivanić Grad, Dobrović actively tried to convert Orthodox Serbians, who had migrated from the Ottoman Empire to Catholicism. He began his endeavors before Simeon Vratanja was appointed as the bishop of Marča. In 1609, Dobrović was authorized by the Roman Catholic Pope, Pope Paul V, to convert Orthodox Serbians to the Catholic faith. Dobrović convinced Simeon Vratanja to accept the Eastern Catholicism and to recognize the Pope's jurisdiction over Eastern Catholic dioceses. In 1611, Dobrović and Vretanja traveled to Rome together. Simeon met with the Pope and formally accepted Eastern Catholicism. In March 1613, in Marča Monastery, Dobrović and Simeon had a meeting with several notable Serbian dukes and tried to convince them to convert to Catholicism and to accept the oversight of the Roman Catholic Archdiocese of Zagreb. Dobrović recommended Matija Sumer from Ivanić to be educated as a Catholic priest.

Dobrović died in 1621.

References

Sources 

 
 
 
 
 
 
 
 
 
 
 
 
 

Converts to Roman Catholicism from Eastern Orthodoxy
Former Serbian Orthodox Christians
1621 deaths
Habsburg Serbs
17th-century Croatian people
17th-century Serbian Roman Catholic priests
Clergy from Graz
People of the Military Frontier
Croatian military chaplains